Kazan Cathedral may refer to:
 Kazan Cathedral, St. Petersburg (Cathedral of Our Lady of Kazan)
 Kazan Cathedral, Moscow (Cathedral of Our Lady of Kazan)
 Kazan Cathedral, Volgograd
 Kazan Cathedral, Havana
 Cathedral of the Annunciation in the Kazan Kremlin